Kill Six Billion Demons—also referred to as Kill 6 Billion Demons, K6BD, and KSBD—is a fantasy/new weird webcomic, written and illustrated by Tom Parkinson-Morgan under the name "Abbadon", and published in print by Image Comics. It was created in 2013 and is yet to reach its finale, though current updates take place in what the author considers to be the series' final book. There are six books in total, named Kill Six Billion Demons, Wielder of Names, Seeker of Thrones, King of Swords, Breaker of Infinities, and Wheel Smashing Lord.

Plot
The plot follows an initially insecure sorority girl named Allison Ruth, who finds herself thrown into a plot many thousands of worlds larger than her. After Allison is forcibly given a powerful fragment of this setting's gods, called a "key", instead of her unstable boyfriend, she discovers that she - alongside a demon named Cio and an angel named White Chain - must fight through a council of seven other keyholders - known as Demiurges - who currently rule the multiverse, in order to save her boyfriend.

Setting 
Kill Six Billion Demons is set throughout a collection of 777,777 separate universes called The Wheel, in which every being lives and travels between via spokes which branch off the city in the center of the wheel, known as Throne. This collection of universes is ruled evenly (111,111 worlds each) by powerful beings known as The Seven, the main antagonists of the plot, and is inhabited by numerous races and cultures.

Other notable locations visited by the protagonists - not including Throne - include Earth, The King's Road, The Void, The White-Eyed Woman, the Temple-Ziggurat of Jadis, Rayuba, Ashton, the Palace of Radiance, and Yre.

Characters 
Characters in Kill Six Billion Demons - namely many of the main antagonists - allude to several of Parkinson-Morgan's inspirations; namely religious ones.

 Allison Ruth, an unequipped sorority girl who is thrust into a world she doesn't understand, with a great power she can't control.
 Ciocie Cioelle, a snarky, demonic secretary and fanfiction writer who follows alongside Allison, seeking a heroic story to write about.
 82 White Chain Born in Emptiness Returns to Subdue Evil (or "White Chain", for short), a cold, unforgiving angel and ardent peacekeeper, who joins Allison to make sure she does not use her new power foolishly.
 Mathangi "Maya" Mantra, a drunkard, recluse, and incredibly powerful warrior, who slowly follows Allison from a distance.
 Gog-Agog, The Queen of Worms, a maddened multiverse-spanning hivemind, and one of the seven Demiurges.
 Incubus, The Sword King, an ambitious, bloodthirsty swordsman who makes deals with Allison, and one of the seven Demiurges.
 Jadis, the Lady of Infinite Repose, an omniscient sorceress who sealed herself in a glass block, and one of the seven Demiurges.
 Jagganoth, The God Eater, a cunning strategist and invincible warrior, and one of the seven Demiurges.
 Mammon, the Grand Dragon, a greedy, ancient reptilian creature hiding within a vault of his own creation, and one of the seven Demiurges.
 Nadia Om, the Blood Flower, a gluttonous queen who strips worlds of their resources, and one of the seven Demiurges.
 Solomon David, the God Emperor of the Celestial Empire, obsessed with maintaining the perfection of his empire through the rule of law, and one of the seven Demiurges.

Origins
According to the author, Kill Six Billion Demons was originally conceived around 2004. Early concepts involved a girl receiving a key from a fugitive, godlike warrior and were supposed to borrow elements from Shōnen manga. The comic began as a "Choose Your Own Adventure" thread on the MS Paint Adventures discussion forum in 2012. The author, then going by the pseudonym "Orbitaldropkick", would allow readers to suggest what should happen next, while Abaddon would set the tone, draw the pages, and choose how exactly the world reacted to the protagonist's reader-chosen antics. Parkinson-Morgan converted it into a standalone webcomic in 2013, hosted on its own website. The first pages were released in monochrome format, however, by chapter 2, Parkinson-Morgan decided to gear his efforts toward fully coloured pages. Image Comics began publishing print compilations in 2016.

Title 
Parkinson-Morgan has noted that the name "Kill Six Billion Demons" was initially conceived under the pretense of the original "Choose Your Own Adventure"-style comic the concept originated from, claiming that "Kill Seven Black Emperors" would be more fitting to the current comic.

Reception
Black Gate praised its "originality, scope of vision, and explosive visuals", calling it "disorienting, unsettling, inspiring, fascinating, (and) beautiful", and comparing it favorably to China Miéville's Perdido Street Station.  Io9 described its art as "stuffed with sumptuous insanity", and lauded Parkinson-Morgan's ability to provide exposition in a way "that would be tedious in a lesser comic". Bleeding Cool noted that the comic "starts out a little rough in the art department", but soon progresses "from a cool looking comic with a great read to a great looking comic with a fantastic read." Publishers Weekly, reviewing the first collected volume, called it "visually and textually stunning", and a display of Parkinson-Morgan's "impressive worldbuilding abilities", but noted that the illustration (although "never muddled") was nonetheless "sketchy", and observed that the plot of that volume "serves mainly as prologue". ComicsBeat praised the comic's writing and art - especially its establishing shots, noting that "Parkinson-Morgan creates amazing establishing shots of massive alien landscapes", and that "there are no generic character designs here. Every time the character enter a new, crowded area it feels like going into Mos Eisley's Cantina".

Inspiration
Parkinson-Morgan has stated that his art in Kill Six Billion Demons is influenced by the work of Wayne Douglas Barlowe and Jean Giraud. The author has also listed Geof Darrow, James Stokoe, Sheldon Vella, and Noriyoshi Ohrai as influences on his work. Additionally, the comic and its' setting draw inspiration from Hindu mythology, Greek Gnosticism, the Berserk series, and The Elder Scrolls.

References

External links

Archive of the original thread in which Kill Six Billion Demons was created

2013 webcomic debuts
Fantasy webcomics
American webcomics
British webcomics
Webcomics in print
Image Comics titles
Demons in comics